Nový Šaldorf-Sedlešovice is a municipality in Znojmo District in the South Moravian Region of the Czech Republic. It has about 1,700 inhabitants.

Administrative parts
The municipality is made up of villages of Nový Šaldorf and Sedlešovice.

Geography
It lies mostly in the Jevišovice Uplands, the southern part of the municipal territory lies in the Dyje–Svratka Valley. The municipality is situated on the left bank of the Thaya River, which separates it from Znojmo.

History
The first written mention of Sedlešovice is from 1190. Nový Šaldorf was founded around 1580, and first mentioned in 1656.

Until 1960, the two villages made up two separate municipalities. Between 1961 and 1976, Sedlešovice was an administrative part of Nový Šaldorf municipality. Between 1976 and 1991, Nový Šaldorf and Sedlešovice were administrative parts of Znojmo. They separated on 1 January 1992 and made the current municipality.

Notable people
Franz Krückl (1841–1899), Austrian operatic baritone

References

External links

Villages in Znojmo District